Hugo Ferreira de Farias (born 29 August 1997), simply known as Hugo, is a Brazilian footballer who plays as a left back for Goiás.

Club career
Hugo was born in Arapiraca, Alagoas, and was a CRB youth graduate. In 2018, he joined Jaciobá, and made his senior debut in the year's Campeonato Alagoano Segunda Divisão.

On 1 May 2019, Hugo joined ABC on loan for two years. On 13 November, after just five matches for the club, his loan was cut short.

In January 2020, Hugo returned to his former side CRB. A backup option to Guilherme Romão, he left the club in May 2021.

On 18 May 2021, Hugo was announced at fellow Série B side Goiás. A regular starter, he scored two goals as the club achieved promotion to the Série A.

Career statistics

Honours
Jaciobá
Campeonato Alagoano Segunda Divisão: 2018

CRB
Campeonato Alagoano: 2020

References

1997 births
Living people
Sportspeople from Alagoas
Brazilian footballers
Association football defenders
Campeonato Brasileiro Série A players
Campeonato Brasileiro Série B players
Campeonato Brasileiro Série C players
ABC Futebol Clube players
Clube de Regatas Brasil players
Goiás Esporte Clube players